José Macotelo Camacho (born July 12, 1985 in San José) is a Costa Rican footballer. He currently plays for Carmelita.

Career
Macotelo started his professional career with Puntarenas of the Primera División. He has made 73 appearances for Puntarenas, beginning with his debut as a second-half substitute against Santos de Guápiles on August 13, 2006.

Macotelo was signed by Chivas USA on loan from Puntarenas on April 30, 2010. His loan was cancelled on July 1, 2010, after he made only a handful of substitute appearances for Chivas USA.

References

External links
 2010-13 league stats - Nación

1985 births
Living people
Footballers from San José, Costa Rica
Association football midfielders
Costa Rican footballers
Costa Rican expatriate footballers
Puntarenas F.C. players
Chivas USA players
Brujas FC players
Belén F.C. players
A.D. Carmelita footballers
Expatriate soccer players in the United States
Major League Soccer players
Liga FPD players